Dzejljane Sakiri (born 12 September 1988) is a Macedonian footballer who plays as a defender. She has been a member of the North Macedonia women's national team.

International career
Sakiri capped for North Macedonia at senior level during the 2011 FIFA Women's World Cup qualification – UEFA Group 2, in a 1–13 away loss to the Netherlands on 29 October 2009.

References

1988 births
Living people
Women's association football defenders
Macedonian women's footballers
North Macedonia women's international footballers
Albanian footballers from North Macedonia